Shankar Lalwani (born 16 October 1961) is an Indian politician. A member of the Bharatiya Janata Party (BJP), Lalwani has served as a Member of Parliament in the 17th Lok Sabha from Indore since 2019. He also held previously the position of chairman in Indore Development Authority.

Personal life
Lalwani was born on 16 October 1961 to Jamnadas Lalwani and Gouridevi Lalwani in Indore, Madhya Pradesh. He is a Sindhi whose family migrated from Pakistan after the Partition of India. Lalwani completed his Higher Secondary from Madhya Pradesh Board in 1978. He graduated with a B. Tech degree from Veermata Jijabai Technological Institute affiliated to University of Bombay.

Lalwani married Amita Lalwani on 10 March 1985, with whom he has a son.

Career
Lalwani is the current Member of Parliament from Indore parliamentary constituency of Madhya Pradesh. He is one of the handful of politicians to have polled more than 10 lakh votes in a Lok Sabha election, having breached the barrier in May 2019. He polled more votes in 2019 than any other Lok Sabha member. His winning margin was 5 lakhs, with many candidates winning with higher margins than that, especially in Gujarat.

Position held
1994 - 1999: Corporator, Municipal Corporation of Indore
1999 - 2004: Chairman, PWD, Municipal Corporation of Indore
2004 - 2009: Chairperson, Municipal Corporation of Indore
2013 - 2018: Chairperson, Indore Development Authority
May 2019 - present : Elected to 17th Lok Sabha
September 2019 - present: Member, Standing Committee on Urban Development

References

External links

1961 births
Living people
Bharatiya Janata Party politicians from Madhya Pradesh
Politicians from Indore
Lok Sabha members from Madhya Pradesh
India MPs 2019–present